The 2022 Huntingdonshire District Council election was held on 5 May 2022 to elect members of Huntingdonshire District Council in England. This was on the same day as other local elections.

The elections saw two councillors elected unopposed, the first uncontested elections in the district since 1988.

Summary

Background

The Conservative Party had been in control of the District Council since 1976. The Conservatives lost eight of their councillors, including the leader of the council, Ryan Fuller. As such the council after the election is under no overall control. A coalition of the Liberal Democrats, Labour, Green and Independent councillors subsequently took control of the council, with Sarah Conboy, the leader of the council's Liberal Democrat group, being appointed leader of the council.

Election result

|-

Ward results

Alconbury

Brampton

Buckden

Fenstanton

Godmanchester and Hemingford Abbots

Great Paxton

Great Staughton

Hemingford Grey and Houghton

Holywell-cum-Needingworth

Huntingdon East

Huntingdon North

Kimbolton

Ramsey

Sawtry

Somersham

St Ives East

St Ives South

St Ives West

St Neots East

St Neots Eatons

St Neots Eynesbury

St Neots Priory Park and Little Paxton

Stilton, Folksworth and Washingley

The Stukeleys

Warboys

Yaxley

References 

Huntingdonshire District Council elections
Huntingdonshire